La Grande Voile (The Big Sail) is a 1965 painted steel sculpture by Alexander Calder, installed in McDermott Court, on the Massachusetts Institute of Technology (MIT) campus, in Cambridge, Massachusetts, United States.

References

External links
 La Grande Voile (The Big Sail), 1965 at cultureNOW

1965 sculptures
Massachusetts Institute of Technology campus
Outdoor sculptures in Cambridge, Massachusetts
Steel sculptures in Massachusetts
Sculptures by Alexander Calder